Festuca picturata is a species of grass which can be found in Central, Eastern and southeastern Europe.

Description
The ligule is going around the eciliate membrane while the leaf-sheaths are tubular, smooth, and have a hairy surface. Leaf-blades are filiform,  broad, and carry 5–7 vascular bundles which have the same amount of inner ridges.

Spikelets are oblong and solitary with pedicelled fertile spikelets that carry some fertile florets that are diminished at the apex. The glumes are chartaceous, keelless, have acute apexes, with only difference is in size.

The palea have two veins while the flowers have three stamens and hairy apex on the ovary. The fruits are caryopses with an additional pericarp and linear hilum.

References

picturata
Flora of Europe